Andrew John Jolley (b Nottingham 21 March 1961) has been Archdeacon of Bradford in the Church of England Diocese of Leeds since 2016.

Jolley was educated at Loughborough Grammar School, the University of Nottingham and Warwick University. A former management consultant, he was ordained after a period of study at St John's College, Nottingham in 1999.  After a curacy in Sparkhill he was Vicar of Aston and Nechells from 2002 until his appointment as archdeacon.

Notes

1961 births
People from Nottingham
People educated at Loughborough Grammar School
Alumni of the University of Nottingham
Alumni of the University of Warwick
Alumni of St John's College, Nottingham
Archdeacons of Bradford
Living people
Anglican Diocese of Leeds